Fred Huntley (29 August 1862 in London, England – 1 November 1931 in Hollywood, California) was an English silent film actor and director.

Fred Huntley made his theater debut at London's Covent Garden in 1879. After years as the leading man with the Carleton Opera Company, Huntley entered the film business as a writer and director for the Selig Polyscope Company in 1912.

Filmography

Actor

 The Still Alarm (1911)
 The Herders (1911)
 Stability vs. Nobility (1911)
 The Novice (1911)
 Told in the Sierras (1911)
 The New Faith (1911)
 The White Medicine Man (1911) - Medicine Man
 It Happened in the West (1911)
 The Profligate (1911)
 The Old Captain (1911)
 Slick's Romance (1911)
 Their Only Son (1911)
 A Turkish Cigarette (1911)
 The Regeneration of Apache Kid (1911)
 The Blacksmith's Love (1911)
 The Rival Stage Lines (1911)
 The Artist's Sons (1911)
 Making a Man of Him (1911)
 On Separate Paths (1911)
 Captain Brand's Wife (1911)
 The Coquette (1911)
 Old Billy (1911)
 Lieutenant Grey of the Confederacy (1911)
 The Bootlegger (1911)
 The New Superintendent (1911)
 The Convent of San Clemente (1911)
 Blackbeard (1911)
 An Evil Power (1911)
 A Diamond in the Rough (1911)
 The Maid at the Helm (1911)
 The Little Widow (1911)
 A Modern Rip (1911)
 The Secret Wedding (1912)
 Merely a Millionaire (1912)
 The Test (1912)
 Bunkie (1912)
 Disillusioned (1912)
 The Danites (1912)
 A Crucial Test (1912)
 The Ones Who Suffer (1912)
 The Hobo (1912)
 A Waif of the Sea (1912)
 Tenderfoot Bob's Regeneration (1912)
 The End of the Romance (1912)
 A Humble Hero (1912)
 A Child of the Wilderness (1912)
 The Substitute Model (1912)
 Monte Cristo (short) (1912) (as Fred Huntly) - Abbe Faria
 A Sad Devil (1912)
 When Helen Was Elected (1912)
 Opitsah: Apache for Sweetheart (1912)
 The Story of Lavinia (1913)
 Greater Wealth (1913)
 The Three Wise Men (1913)
 The Early Bird (1913)
 Willie (1914)
 Chip of the Flying U (1914) - Old Man
 Ye Vengeful Vagabonds (1914)
 Hearts and Masks (1914)
 The Wasp (1914) - Joe Collins
 The Broken 'X''' (1914)
 Retribution (1915)
 Poetic Justice of Omar Khan (1915)
 The Carpet from Bagdad (1915) - Wallace
 The Rosary (1915) - Evarts
 The Circular Staircase (1915) (as Fred Huntly) - Detective Jamieson
 A Janitor's Wife's Temptation (1915)
 Fighting Blood (1916) - Henry Colby, Her Father
 The Ne'er Do Well (1916) - Andres Garavel
 A Man of Sorrow (1916)
 The Fires of Conscience (1916) - Peter Rogers
 The Marcellini Millions (1917) - Mr. Hargrave
 A Roadside Impresario (1917) - John Slade
 The City of Purple Dreams (1918) - Thomas Quigg
 Rimrock Jones (1918) - Leon Lockhart
 The Only Road (1918) - Ramon Lupo
 Johanna Enlists (1918) - Pa Renssaller
 A Lady's Name (1918) - Adams
 The Sea Flower (1918) - 'Brandy' Cain
 The Heart of Wetona (1919) - Chief Quannah
 Johnny Get Your Gun (1919) - Jevne
 For Better, for Worse (1919) - Colonial Soldier
 Fires of Faith (1919) - Joe Lee
 Daddy-Long-Legs (1919) (uncredited)
 Love Insurance (1919) - Jenkins
 Her Kingdom of Dreams (1919) - Parker
 The Lottery Man (1919) - Hamilton
 Heart o' the Hills (1919) (as Fred W. Huntley) - Granpap Jason Hawn
 Everywoman (1919) - Dissipation
 Excuse My Dust (1920) (uncredited) - Police Magistrate
 The Sea Wolf (1920) - Old Man Johnson
 The Soul of Youth (1920) - Mr. Hodge
 The Round-Up (1920) - Sagebrush Charlie
 Behold My Wife! (1920) (as Fred Huntly) - Chief Eye-of-the-Moon
 Dice of Destiny (1920) (as Frederick Huntley) - 'Gloomy' Cole
 Brewster's Millions (1921) - Mr. Brewster
 What Every Woman Knows (1921) (as Fred Huntly) - David Wylie
 The Bronze Bell (1921) - Maharajah
 A Wise Fool (1921) - Sebastian Dolores
 Gasoline Gus (1921)
 The Face of the World (1921) - Attorney Gundahl
 The Affairs of Anatol (1921) (uncredited) - Stage manager
 A Prince There Was (1921) - Mr. Cricket
 The Little Minister (1921) (as Fred Huntly) - Peter Tosh
 The Man with Two Mothers (1922) (as Fred Huntly) - Butler
 The Crimson Challenge (1922) (as Fred Huntly) - Confora
 North of the Rio Grande (1922) - Briston
 While Satan Sleeps (1922) - Absolom Randall
 Borderland (1922) - William Beckett
 To Have and to Hold (1922) - Paradise
 Peg o' My Heart (1922) (as Fred Huntly) - Butler
 The Go-Getter (1923) - Jack Morgan
 Law of the Lawless (1923) - Osman
 Where the North Begins (1923) - Scotty McTavish
 To the Last Man (1923) - Lee Jorth
 The Call of the Canyon (1923) - Tom Hutter
 The Mine with the Iron Door (1924)
 Thundering Hoofs (1924) - John Marshall
 The Age of Innocence (1924)
 The King of Kings'' (1927) (uncredited) - Undetermined Role  *****

External links

 
 

1862 births
1931 deaths
Male actors from London
English male film actors
English male silent film actors
English film directors
Male Western (genre) film actors
20th-century English male actors
British expatriate male actors in the United States